Doingt is a commune in the Somme department in Hauts-de-France in northern France.

Geography

History
Completely destroyed during World War I. A Commonwealth cemetery is just outside the town.

Population

See also
Communes of the Somme department

References

External links

 CWG Cemetery
 Doingt on the Quid website 

Communes of Somme (department)